Jakub Luka (born 18 August 2003) is a Slovak professional footballer who currently plays for Fortuna Liga club Ružomberok as a defender.

Club career

MFK Ružomberok
Luka signed a contract with MFK Ružomberok in January 2021, signing from MŠK Žilina Academy, where he played with the U19 team. Following his signing, he joined the first team of Ružomberok and expressed hope of making his senior debut during the spring and summer of 2021.

Luka made his Fortuna Liga debut for Ružomberok against Zemplín Michalovce on 1 May 2021 in a 1:2 away loss. He played the entire match.

Private life
Luka had listed Milan Škriniar and Virgil van Dijk as his footballing idols.

References

External links
 MFK Ružomberok official club profile 
 
 Futbalnet profile 
 

2003 births
Living people
Place of birth missing (living people)
Slovak footballers
Slovakia youth international footballers
Association football defenders
MFK Ružomberok players
Slovak Super Liga players